Xingguo railway station is a railway station in Xingguo County, Ganzhou, Jiangxi, China. It is an intermediate stop on the Beijing–Kowloon railway and the western terminus of the Xingguo–Quanzhou railway.

History
The station opened in 1996. From 8 December 2019, facilities were moved to a temporary room to allow the main station building to be rebuilt. The new station building was opened on 26 September 2021.

References 

Railway stations in Jiangxi
Railway stations in China opened in 1996